Rebecca Feemster Dye is an American attorney who has served as a commissioner of the Federal Maritime Commission since November 14, 2002.

Early life and education
Dye grew up in Charlotte, North Carolina. She attended the University of North Carolina at Chapel Hill.

Career 
Dye began her career as a commissioned officer and attorney in the United States Coast Guard. She has served as law instructor at the United States Coast Guard Academy, an attorney at the United States Maritime Administration. and a Minority Counsel in Committee on Merchant Marine and Fisheries. Dye was the Counsel to the United States House Committee on Transportation and Infrastructure from 1995 until 2002.

Dye was nominated by President George W. Bush as Commissioner of the Federal Maritime Commission on June 13, 2002, and was confirmed by the United States Senate on November 14, 2002. She was nominated to her second term by President Bush on July 12, 2005, and confirmed by the Senate on July 22, 2005.

Dye was nominated to her third term by President Barack Obama and confirmed by the Senate on April 14, 2011. On May 26, 2016, She was nominated for her fourth term by President Obama and confirmed by the Senate on June 29, 2016, for a term expiring June 30, 2020.

See also
Michael A. Khouri
Daniel B. Maffei
Louis E. Sola
Carl Bentzel

References

Federal Maritime Commission members
Living people
People from North Carolina
University of North Carolina alumni
1952 births

George W. Bush administration personnel
Obama administration personnel
Trump administration personnel